Melaleuca laxiflora, commonly known as narrow-leaved paperbark, is a woody, spreading shrub in the myrtle family, Myrtaceae and is endemic to the south-west of Western Australia. It is distinguished by its loosely arranged, mostly lateral pink flower spikes and its smooth, fleshy, oil-dotted leaves. It is often cultivated because of its hardiness and attractive flowers.

Description

The flowers are mauve, pink or purple, sometimes white, in heads of 6 to 20 individual flowers along the sides of the branches. The stamens are arranged in five bundles around the flower, each bundle with 12 to 18 stamens.

Taxonomy and naming
Melaleuca laxiflora was first formally described in 1852 by Nikolai Turczaninow in "Bulletin de la classe physico-mathematique de l'Academie Imperiale des sciences de Saint-Petersburg". The specific epithet (laxiflora) is from the Latin words laxus, meaning "loose" or slack and -florus meaning "flowered" referring to the relatively wide separation between individual flowers in each spike.

Distribution and habitat
This melaleuca occurs from the Mollerin district, south and east to the  Ongerup and  Norseman districts in the Avon Wheatbelt, Coolgardie and Mallee biogeographic regions. It grows in sandy or clayey soils, often over granite, on flats and roadsides.

Conservation status
Melaleuca laxiflora is listed as "not threatened" by the Government of Western Australia Department of Parks and Wildlife.

Use in horticulture
This species has frequently been cultivated and is a hardy plant in a well-drained, sunny position. It is suited to semi-dry and temperate climates rather than humid areas.

References

laxiflora
Myrtales of Australia
Plants described in 1852
Endemic flora of Western Australia
Taxa named by Nikolai Turczaninow